Koshino is a village in the municipality of Dolneni, North Macedonia.

Demographics
According to the 2021 census, the village had a total of 66 inhabitants. Ethnic groups in the village include:

Macedonians 60
Albanians 2
Others 4

References

Villages in Dolneni Municipality